Moros y Cristianos or Moros i Cristians literally in English Moors and Christians, is a set of festival activities which are celebrated in many towns and cities of Spain, mainly in the southern Valencian Community. According to popular tradition the festivals commemorate the battles, combats and fights between Moors (i.e. Muslims) and Christians during the period known as Reconquista (from the 8th century through the 15th century). There are also festivals of Moros y Cristianos in Spanish America.

The festivals represent the capture of the city by the Muslims and the subsequent Christian reconquering fight. The people who take part in the festival are usually enlisted in local associations called  (singular ) or comparses (companies that represent the Christian or Moor legions). The festivals last for several days, and feature festive parades with bombastic costumes loosely inspired by Medieval fashion. Christians wear fur, metallic helmets, and armor, fire loud arquebuses, and ride horses. In contrast, Moors wear ancient Arab costumes, carry scimitars, and ride real camels or elephants. The festival develops among shots of gunpowder, medieval music, and fireworks, and ends with the Christians winning a simulated battle around a castle.

Due to Spanish colonization, the performing art has been adapted in the Philippines since the 17th century and is a popular street play throughout the country. Unlike the Spanish version, the Philippine version is dominated by indigenous Philippine cultures which are used in language, costumes, musics, and dances of the play. The main story of the art, however, has been faithfully retained. Similar celebrations in Zacatecas, México, are called Morisma.

Venues

The most well-known Moors and Christians festival are the Moors and Christians of Alcoy that takes place in Alcoi (Valencian Community) from 22 to 24 April, around the Feast Day of Saint George (Valencian: Sant Jordi; Spanish: San Jorge), the patron saint of the Crown of Aragon (Catalonia, Aragon and formerly also of the Valencian Community). According to legend, after James I of Aragon reconquered the city of Alcoi, the Moors, in turn, tried to recover it. As fighting was about to resume, Saint George miraculously appeared, and the frightened Moors scattered in defeat. Other traditions ascribe a miraculous saintly appearance to Saint James (Santiago), the patron saint of Spain, particularly at the Battle of Las Navas de Tolosa (in what today is the municipality of La Carolina, Province of Jaén, Andalusia), sometimes guiding the Christians to surprise the Moors; else rallying Christian forces during the battle. The feast day of St. James is 25 July, so some of the Moors' and Christians' festivals occur at the end of July. La Vila Joiosa / Villajoyosa celebrates it in the last week of July, with a reenactment of the Berber pirate attack of 1538 (desembarc), according to tradition repelled when St. Martha (feast day 29 July) sent a flash flood. Especially in northern and western Spain (Catalonia, Valencian Community, and other places), parades associated with Corpus Christi celebrations may feature gigantic costumed Moors and Christians, also commemorating the Reconquest. 

Other noteworthy Moors and Christians festivals are celebrated in the towns of Bocairent (a Medieval town, 1–5 February), Banyeres de Mariola (22-25 April), Villena with approximately 12,000 participants (most crowded festival), Almoradí (early August), Biar, Cocentaina, Crevillent, El Campello, Elche, Elda, Muro d'Alcoi, Oliva, Ontinyent (late August), Orihuela, Petrel, Sax, Novelda, Monforte del Cid, and some districts of the city of Alicante.

Andalusia also has very interesting Moors and Christians performances, especially in the former Moorish kingdom of Granada. Performances are mostly organized in rural towns and villages, such as Válor, Granada, a small town in the Eastern Alpujarras.

Spaniards took this tradition overseas. In the Philippines, fiestas often include a moro-moro play. The show begins with a parade of stars in colorful costumes: Christians wear blue costumes, while Moors wear fully ornamented red costumes. Mexico, Guatemala, Peru  and Colombia also have festivals featuring Moors and Christians reenactments (the Mexican term is morisma).

Philippine Moro y Cristianos
In the Philippines, the performing art is officially called Moro y Cristianos Street Drama by the National Commission for Culture and the Arts, the cultural agency of the government. On July 5, 1637, Jesuit priest F. Hironimo Perez finished the first Moro y Cristianos play in the Philippines. The first drama was played in a church, and was presented to the governor-general for a victory play against Muslims in the south. Afterwards, the play became known in the common tongue as moro-moro, which is the common name of the street drama today. The street drama itself, however, did not draw from actual Christian-Muslim conflict in the Philippines. The main precursor of its popularity in the Philippines was the indigenous awit and corrido traditions in Philippine native cultures.

When performing, the representations for the Christians are in blue, while the representations for Muslims are in red or maroon. The street drama includes pasa dobles tune marches, rigodon in battles, courtships between a Moro prince and a Christian princess and vice versa, and a conclusion which usually depicts the Muslim converting into Christianity, the Muslim dying, or the appearance of the Virgin Mary or a saint as the intervention figure of the conflict. The komedya usually begins with a loa, followed by a parada. Usually, the main part of the story begins with a Muslim embahador delivering a challenge to an equally-boastful Christian. The street drama became popular in the rural areas due to the inputting of folk traditions in the play and the need of the people for leisure, especially after a hard day at labor. Overall, the Philippine moros y cristianos may last from one to several days, depending on the Philippine-written script being used.

In 2011, the performing art was cited by the National Commission for Culture and the Arts as one of the intangible cultural heritage of the Philippines under the performing arts category that the government may nominate in the UNESCO Intangible Cultural Heritage Lists.

Music
In Spain, a live marching band plays one of three kinds of music called marchas moras, marchas cristianas and pasodobles. The former two are in the medium or quick time pace. The band, alongside the standard instrumentation, also carries a concert bass drum, timpani and tam-tams.

Music for the Mexican morisma may be played by a marching band and/or a drum and bugle band.

See also 
 Moors and Christians of Alcoy
 Museu Alcoià de la Festa

References

Further reading

Albert-Llorca, Marlène, and José Antonio González Alcantud, eds. Moros y cristianos: representaciones del otro en las fiestas del Mediterraneo occidental. Presses Univ. du Mirail, 2003.
Alcantud, José Antonio González. "Imágenes para el ritual: moros y cristianos en el complejo festivo y ceremonial granadino José Antonio González Alcantud." Fêtes et divertissements 8 (1997): 143.
Barceló, Julio Berenguer. Historia de los Moros y Cristianos de Alcoy. 1974.
Bataillon, Marcel. Por un inventario de las fiestas de moros y cristianos: Otro toque de atención. Servicio de publicaciones del Teatro Universitario de San Marcos, 1976.
Becerra, Salvador Rodríguez. "Las fiestas de moros y cristianos en Andalucía." Gazeta de Antropología 3 (1984).
Beutler, Gisela. "Algunas observaciones sobre los textos de moros y cristianos en México y Centroamérica." Actas del VIII Congreso de la Asociación Internacional de Hispanistas: 22-27 agosto 1983. Ediciones Istmo, 1986.
Botella, Ana María. "Análisis del tratamiento curricular de la música de Moros y Cristianos en los libros de música de enseñanza secundaria." LEEME, Journal of Music in Education 25 (2010): 1-25.
Brisset, Demetrio. Fiestas de moros y cristianos en Granada. Diputación Provincial, 1988.
Cáceres Valderrama, Milena. La fiesta de moros y cristianos en el Perú. Fondo Editorial PUCP, 2005.
Carrasco Urgoiti, Maria Soledad. “Aspectos Folclóricos y Literarios De La Fiesta De Moros y Cristianos En España.” PMLA, vol. 78, no. 5, 1963, pp. 476–491., www.jstor.org/stable/460725.
Coloma, Rafael. Libro de la fiesta de moros y cristianos de Alcoy. Vol. 13. ediciones del Instituto Alcoyano de Cultura" Andrés Sempere", 1962.
Contreras, Constantino. Teatro folklórico: una representación de moros y cristianos.  1965.
 Domene, J., González Hernández, M.A. y Vázquez, V. (2006): Las fiestas de moros y cristianos en el Vianlopó. Centre d’Estudis Locals del Vinalopó-Mancomunitat de Municipis del Vinalopó (Alacant), 312 págs. 
Fernández Hervás, Enrique. "Fiestas de moros y cristianos en España y su estudio en la provincia de Jaén." (1992).
García-Valdés, Celsa Carmen. "Moros y cristianos en dos dramas de Calderón: El príncipe constante y El gran príncipe de Fez." (1997).
 González Hernández, Miguel-Ángel (1996): La Fiesta de Moros y Cristianos: Orígenes siglos XIII-XVIII. Diputación Provincial de Alicante, 163 págs. 
 González Hernández, Miguel-Ángel (1997): La Fiesta de Moros y Cristianos: Evolución siglos XIX-XX. Diputación Provincial de Alicante, 156 págs. 
 González Hernández, Miguel-Ángel (1999): Moros y Cristianos. Del Alarde Medieval a las Fiestas Reales Barrocas ss. XV-XVIII.  Diputación de Alicante-Patronato Provincial de Turismo de Alicante.  302 págs. 
 González Hernández, Miguel-Ángel (2004): Castalla en el origen de la Fiesta de Moros y Cristianos (1473-1804). Alicante, Diputación de Alicante y Asociación de Comparsas, 201 págs. 
Jáuregui, Jesús, and Carlo Bonfiglioli. Las danzas de conquista. Fondo de cultura económica, 1996.
Mansanet Ribes, José Luis. "La fiesta de moros y cristianos como institución y su ordenación." I Congreso Nacional de Fiestas de Moros y Cristianos. 1976.
Martín, Demetrio E. Brisset. "Fiestas hispanas de moros y cristianos. Historia y significados." Gazeta de Antropología 17 (2001).
Montoya, Matilde. Estudio sobre el baile de la conquista. No. 64. Editorial Universitaria, 1970.
Nicolás, Botella, and Ana María. "Orígenes de la música en las Fiestas de Moros y Cristianos de Alcoy." Revista de Folklore 372 (2013): 28–38.
Palencia, Angel González. Moros y cristianos en España medieval: estudios histórico-literarios. 3. ser. Consejo Superior de Investigaciones Cientificas, Instituto Antonio de Nebrÿa, 1945.
Ravines, Roger. "Moros y Cristianos, espectáculo tradicional religioso de San Lucas de Colán, Piura." Boletín de Lima 41 (1988): 52.
Renedo, Carmen Muñoz. La representación de moros y cristianos de Zújar. 1972.
Ribes, José Luis Mansanet. La Fiesta de Moros y Cristianos de Alcoy y sus instituciones. Obra Cultural del Monte de Piedad y Caja de Ahorros, 1969.
Ricard, Robert. "Contribution à l'étude des Fetes de «Moros y Cristianos» au Méxique." Journal de la Société des Américanistes 24.1 (1932): 51-84.
Ricard, Robert. Otra contribución al estudio de las fiestas de" Moros y Cristianos". 1958.
Santamarina Campos, Beatriz. "Moros y cristianos. De la batalla festiva a la discursiva." (2008).
Taboada, Jesús. "Moros y cristianos en tierras de Laza (Orense)." Revista de Dialectología y Tradiciones Populares 11.3 (1955): 334.
Warman Gryj, Arturo. La danza de moros y cristianos. Secretaría de Educación Pública, Mexico 1972.

External links

 Pictures of Moros y Cristianos in Muro de Alcoy 2006
 Unión Nacional de Entidades Festeras de Moros y Cristianos, Web page of the official organization, in Spanish.
 Moros y Cristianos Villajoyosa, Pictures of Moros y Cristianos festival in La Vila Joiosa.
 Alcoy Foto Pictures of Alcoy and La fiesta de moros y cristianos in Alcoy.
 Moros i Cristians of Alcoi.
 Moros y Cristianos Festival history and today
 MusicaFestera.com Music of  Moros y Cristianos
 Moros y Cristianos of Elda.
 Moros y Cristianos of Villena.
 Junta Festera de Moros i Cristians del Campello, Web page of the official organization.
 Comparsa Saudites d'Ontinyent (valencian)  
 Tourist information Travel guide and info.

Reconquista
Spanish culture
Theatre in the Philippines
Valencian culture
Festivals in Spain
Mock combat
Theatre in Spain